Albert Montañés is the defending champion but lost in the first round to Gianluca Naso.
Dustin Brown defeated Filippo Volandri 7–6(7–5), 6–3

Seeds

Draw

Finals

Top half

Bottom half

References
 Main Draw
 Qualifying Draw

AON Open Challenger - Singles
AON Open Challenger
AON